Radioactive waste water has been discharged into the Pacific Ocean since the Fukushima Daiichi nuclear disaster, triggered by the 2011 Tōhoku earthquake and tsunami on 11 March 2011 in Japan. Most of the radioactive materials came from immediate leaks into the atmosphere, 80% of which eventually deposited over the Pacific (and over some rivers). Leakage to groundwater has persisted since the disaster and was only first admitted by the nuclear plant in 2013. Water treatment began that year as the "Advanced Liquid Processing System" became operable, which is capable of removing most radionuclides except notably tritium. In 2021, the Japanese cabinet approved the dumping of radioactive water into the Pacific over a course of 30 years.

Discharge to groundwater by leakage

Initially, as of June 2011, the biggest threat was the leakage of caesium from the nuclear reactors into the Pacific. Over time, groundwater became the main source for leaks. While soil naturally absorbs the caesium in groundwater, strontium and tritium flow more freely through the soil into the ocean.

Despite repeated denial of leaks, the operator of the nuclear plant, Tokyo Electric Power Company (TEPCO), on 22 July 2013 finally admitted that leaks to groundwater had been happening, something long suspected. It was later determined the leaks came from the water tanks from 2013 to 2014. Since then, TEPCO has had a record of being dishonest on its figures and has lost the public trust. For instance, in 2014, TEPCO blamed its own measuring method and revised the strontium in a groundwater well in July 2013 to be 5 million becquerels per liter, which is 160,000 times the standard for discharge.

The UNSCEAR report in 2020 concluded "Direct release of about 60 TBq [terabecquerel, 1012 Bq] of Caesium-137 in ground water draining from the site up to October 2015, when measures were taken to reduce these releases, and about 0.5 TBq per year thereafter".

Deposition on river
The indirect deposition to rivers come from the earlier direct discharge to the atmosphere. "Continuing indirect releases of about 5 to 10 TBq [terabecquerel, 1012 Bq] of Caesium-137 per year via rivers draining catchment areas", according to the UNSCEAR report in 2020.

Discharge to ocean by dumping

Immediately after the disaster
On 5 April 2011, the operator of the nuclear plant, Tokyo Electric Power Company (TEPCO), discharged 11,500 tons of untreated water into the Pacific Ocean in order to free up storage space for water that is even more radioactive. The untreated water was the least radioactive contaminated among the stored water, but still 100 times the legal limit. In May 2011, another 300,000 tons of untreated radioactive water were dumped to free water tanks.

The UNSCEAR report in 2020 determined "direct releases in the first three months amounting to about 10 to 20 PBq [petabecquerel, 1015 Bq] of Iodine-131 and about 3 to 6 PBq of Caesium-137". About 82 percent having flowed into the sea before 8 April 2011.

Government final approval in 2021

Since the 2011 Fukushima Daiichi nuclear disaster, the nuclear plant has accumulated 1.25 million tonnes of waste water, stored in 1,061 tanks on the land of the nuclear plant, as of March 2021. It will run out of land for water tanks by 2022. It has been suggested the government could have solved the problem by allocating more land surrounding the power plant for water tanks, since the surrounding area had been designated as unsuitable for humans. Regardless, the government was reluctant to act. Mainichi Shimbun criticized the government for showing "no sincerity" in "unilaterally push[ing] through with the logic that there will no longer be enough storage space"

On 13 April 2021, the Cabinet of Prime Minister Suga unanimously approved that TEPCO dump the stored water to the Pacific Ocean over a course of 30 years. The Cabinet asserted the dumped water will be treated and diluted to drinkable standard. The idea of dumping had been floated by Japanese experts and officials as early as June 2016.

Treatment of water (2013-)

Water dumped before 2013 was not treated. Water treatment began in March 2013 as "Advanced Liquid Processing System" (ALPS) become operable. ALPS was designed to remove radionuclides; however, experts have criticised that the process cannot completely remove radioisotopes like carbon-14 and tritium, an isotope of hydrogen.

The treatment process began by pouring 400 metric tonnes of water everyday into the damaged reactor buildings to cool them from nuclear meltdown. In addition, another 400 metric tonnes of groundwater was seeping into the basements of buildings and became radioactive contaminated each day. Therefore, 800 tonnes of water was pumped out every day and treated for caesium removal and desalination. While half of the water pumped out was reused for cooling the reactors, the remaining 400 tonnes ended up in storage tanks. As of 2020, the resulted contaminated water reduced to 170 metric tonnes per day. 20% of the water had been treated to the required level as of September 2018, according to TEPCO.

Reactions to dumping

Official nuclear science panels

The Japanese expert panel "ALPS subcommittee", set up by Prime Minister Abe, released a report in January 2020 which calculated that discharging all the water to the sea in one year would cause a radiation dose of 0.81 microsieverts to the locals, therefore it is negligible as compared to the Japanese' natural radiation of 2,100 microsieverts per year. Its calculations was endorsed by IAEA.

Japanese public

A panel of public policy professors pointed out the lack of research on the harmful effects of tritium. It also criticized the government being insincere on accepting alternative disposal proposals as the proposals were always shelved after "procedural" discussion.

A survey by Asahi Shimbun in December 2020 found, among 2,126 respondents, that 55% of Japanese opposed dumping and 86% worried about international reception. 
The Fukushima Fishery Cooperatives was given written promises by TEPCO's CEO Hirose Naomi in 2015 that TEPCO would not dump the water before consulting the fishery industry. The Cooperatives felt bypassed and betrayed by the government's decision.

International reactions

In opposition
Baskut Tuncak, United Nations's Special Rapporteur on toxics and human rights, wrote on Japan's Kyodo News that "The communities of Fukushima [...] It is their human right to [...] not be exposed deliberately to additional radioactive contamination. Those rights should be fully respected and not be disregarded by the government in Tokyo. [...] It saddens me to think that a country that has suffered the horrors of being the only country on which not one but two nuclear bombs would continue on a such a path in dealing with the radioactive aftermath of the Fukushima Daiichi disaster." Greenpeace and five other UN Rapporteurs (including Clément Nyaletsossi Voule), respectively, issued condemnation echoing those sentiments.
The U.S. National Association of Marine Laboratories, expressed their opposition to the plan and stated that “there was a lack of adequate and accurate scientific data supporting Japan’s assertion of safety".
The Pacific Islands Forum expressed deep concerns and urged Japan to rethink its decision on the discharge of the ALPS Treated Water.

Various governments have voiced concerns, including the governments of South Korea, North Korea, Taiwan, China, Russia, the Philippines, New Zealand, Belize, Costa Rica, Dominican Republic, El Salvador, Guatemala, Honduras, Nicaragua, Panama, Mexico, and Micronesia.
At least 70 U.S. civic groups condemned Japan's wastewater discharge plan, and 17 civic organizations from various countries held protests in Berlin.

In support
International Atomic Energy Agency's top official Rafael Grossi reached a consensus with the Japanese on 23 March 2021, three weeks before the Japanese announced its decision to dump the water.

U.S. Secretary of State Antony Blinken stated on 13 April 2021, “We thank Japan for its transparent efforts in its decision to dispose of the treated water”. US Climate Envoy John Kerry expressed support.

Discharge to atmosphere

Among all radioactive materials discharged, most came from leaks into the atmosphere immediate after the disaster, which 80% eventually deposit over the Pacific (and some over rivers), according to the UNSCEAR report in 2020. Specifically, "The total releases to the atmosphere of Iodine-131 and Caesium-137 ranged generally between about 100 to about 500 PBq [petabecquerel, 1015 Bq] and 6 to 20 PBq, respectively. The ranges correspond to about 2% to 8% of the total inventory of Iodine-131 and about 1% to 3% of the total inventory of Caesium-137 in the three operating units (Units 1–3)".

Environmental effects

General opinion
"There is consensus among scientists that the impact on health is minuscule, still, it can't be said the risk is zero, which is what causes controversy", Michiaki Kai, a Japanese nuclear expert, told AFP. Scientists and officials claiming the treated water to be scientifically safe are generally met with skepticism as they refuse to consume the treated water themselves. Also, presenting the science alone has yet to gain public trust, as TEPCO has a history of being dishonest on leaks while the government's attitude was deemed insincere by the public.

Data on concentrations
Concentrations declined faster in coastal waters than in coastal sediments. By 2013, the concentrations of caesium-137 in the Fukushima coastal waters were around the level before the accident. However, coastal sediments are "influenced by inputs of caesium-137 bound to clay minerals in sediments. The inventory of caesium-137 in coastal sediments is now thought to exceed the inventory in the overlying water column, and the sediments could provide a long-term source of caesium-137 in seawater."

Data on marine foods indicates their radioactive concentrations are falling towards initial levels. 41% of samples caught off the Fukushima coast in 2011 had caesium-137 concentrations above the legal limit (100 becquerels per kilogram), and this had declined to 0.05% in 2015. United States Food and Drug Administration stated in 2021 that "FDA has no evidence that radionuclides from the Fukushima incident are present in the U.S. food supply at levels that are unsafe". Yet, presenting the science alone has not helped customers to regain their trust on eating Fukushima fishery products.

Comparison to other nuclear facilities
As of April 2021, total amount of tritium stored in Fukushima Daiichi Nuclear Power Plant is about 860 terabecquerels (TBq). In comparison to the discharge of tritium from nuclear facilities across the world, see the table below. In 2018, La Hague reprocessing plant in France discharged 11,460 TBq of tritium, which is more than 13 times the total amount of tritium stored in Fukushima Daiichi Nuclear Power Plant. From 2010 to 2020, nuclear power plants in South Korea discharged a total of 4,362 TBq of tritium, which is more than 5 times the total amount of tritium stored in Fukushima Daiichi Nuclear Power Plant.

See also
2011 Tōhoku earthquake and tsunami
2011 Fukushima nuclear disaster
London Convention on the Prevention of Marine Pollution by Dumping of Wastes and Other Matter
Nuclear power in Japan

References

External links
Basic policy on handling of the ALPS treated water, Ministry of Economy, Trade and Industry, Japan

Fukushima Daiichi nuclear disaster
Environmental issues in Japan
Water pollution in Japan
Water supply and sanitation in Japan
Fishing industry in Japan
Natural history of Japan
Nature conservation in Japan
Environmental controversies
Fukushima Prefecture
2011 in Japan
2021 in Japan
2011 in the environment
2021 in the environment
2011 industrial disasters
2011 Tōhoku earthquake and tsunami
Radiation accidents and incidents
INES Level 7 accidents
History of the Pacific Ocean